Hop De Bakim  is a Turkish and Anatolian Greek folkloric tune (Kaşık Havası).The meter is .

References

Turkish music
Turkish songs
Greek music
Greek songs